The Boiling Springs Tavern is a restaurant located in Boiling Springs, Pennsylvania.

The Boiling Springs Tavern was built in 1832 by Philip Brechbill in the Federal style with native limestone and originally was used as a hotel.  Anheuser-Busch was its first owner.

Today the Boiling Springs Tavern is a restaurant and bar.The tavern has been closed since the beginning of the COVID-19 pandemic.

References

External links 
Boiling Springs Tavern website

Hotel buildings completed in 1832
Restaurants in Pennsylvania
Buildings and structures in Cumberland County, Pennsylvania
Hotels established in 1832